The Runaway is a six-part British television crime drama series, adapted by Allan Cubitt from the novel by Martina Cole, that first broadcast on Sky1 on 31 March 2011. Directed by David Richards, The Runaway is set in the sleazy, gritty world of '60s and '70s London, and focuses on the doomed romance of East Londoners Cathy Connor (Joanna Vanderham) and Eamonn Docherty (Jack O'Connell). The series also co-stars Burn Gorman, Keith Allen and Kierston Wareing among others.

Principal shooting on the series took place in South Africa, which doubled up for 1960s Soho. Original music for the series was written by Chris Letcher, alongside Ben Bartlett. The Runaway was the second of Cole's novels to be adapted by Company Pictures for Sky, following on from The Take, starring Tom Hardy and Charlotte Riley, that first broadcast in 2009. The complete series of The Runaway was released on DVD via ITV Studios on 9 May 2011.

Reception
Patrick Smith of The Telegraph said of the first episode; "Martina Cole's crime novels aren't for the faint-hearted: they are gritty, lurid and relentlessly brutal. It's no surprise, then, that the opening episode of The Runaway made for uncomfortable viewing. Although one moment captured this transformation perfectly, the rest of the episode wasn’t nearly as gripping. The central storyline was hackneyed, while Keith Allen, sporting a horrendous wig, sounded – irritatingly – as if he was channelling Danny Dyer. I was a little disappointed with Jack O'Connell, too. He wasn't bad. It's just that, having watched him play Cook in Skins with such élan, I was expecting a tour de force."

Metro published a slightly more positive review, writing: "Despite the Lock Stock clichés that lurked at every turn, The Runaway had me running with it. Opening with a knockout boxing scene straight out of Raging Bull, The Runaway had a sweaty, salty tang about it, an intensity that overcame the fact it staggered about, drunk on its own testosterone."

Plot
While unrelated by blood, Cathy Connor and Eamonn Docherty live as brother and sister growing up and embark on a secret relationship. The couple are torn apart when Cathy is sent into care, but she manages to escape and finds her way onto the streets of Soho. Befriended by colourful transvestite Desrae, Cathy grows up in the heart of London's underworld, while Eamonn is drawn into a life of crime and ultimately flees to New York. The pair are finally drawn back together in the midst of the nation's impending future, but their future is far from safe.

Cast
 Jack O'Connell as Eamonn Docherty Jnr.
 Joanna Vanderham as Cathy Connor
 Burn Gorman as Richard Gates
 Keith Allen as Danny Dixon
 Kierston Wareing as Madge
 Alan Cumming as Desrae
 Sam Spruell as Jim Harvey
 Ken Stott as Joey Pasqualino
 Mark Womack as Eamonn Docherty Snr.
 Nora-Jane Noone as Caitlin
 Max Irons as Tommy Pasqualino
 Emily Beecham as Caroline Dixon
 Dominika Jablonska as Maureen
 Grant Swanby as Sean Carty
 David Westhead as Ron Carver

Episodes

References

External links 

Sky UK original programming
2010s British television miniseries
2010s British drama television series
2011 British television series debuts
2011 British television series endings
Television series by All3Media
English-language television shows